Melquíades is a Spanish given name. It is the Spanish form of the Greek name Melchiades, as in Pope Miltiades.

Notable individuals 

Melquíades Álvarez (politician) (1864–1936), Spanish politician, founder and leader of the Reformist Republican Party
Melquíades Morales (born 1942), Mexican lawyer and politician, affiliated with the Partido Revolucionario Institucional
Melquíades Fundora, Cuban flautist

Mel Martinez, (born 1946), American politician, former US Senator from Florida, Chairman of the Republican Party
Mel Rojas (born 1966), Dominican baseball pitcher

Fiction 

 Melquíades Estrada, character in The Three Burials of Melquiades Estrada
 Melquíades, character in One Hundred Years of Solitude
 Melquíades Elquiza, character in The Cook of Castamar

Other 

 Melquíades, official name of exoplanet HD 93083 b

Spanish masculine given names